Miltochrista striata is a moth of the family Erebidae. It was described by Otto Vasilievich Bremer and William Grey in 1852. It is found in the Russian Far East (Middle Amur, Primorye, southern Sakhalin, Kunashir), China (Jiangsu, Zhejiang, Jiangxi, Fujiang, Hunan, Guangxi, Shaanxi, Sichuan), Korea and Japan.

References

 Arctiidae genus list at Butterflies and Moths of the World of the Natural History Museum

striata
Moths described in 1852
Moths of Asia